Dhilakani is a 2013 Maldivian romantic thriller film directed by Hussain Munawwar. Produced under Antharees Production, the film stars Ismail Rasheed, Niuma Mohamed, Mohamed Manik, Aminath Rishfa and Mohamed Faisal in pivotal roles. The film was released on 27 May 2013.

Cast 
 Ismail Rasheed as Shamin
 Niuma Mohamed as Lara
 Mohamed Manik as Shahid
 Aminath Rishfa as Moonisa
 Mohamed Faisal as Shanil
 Roanu Hassan Manik as Ibrahim Saleem
 Mariyam Haleem as Faathuma
 Ahmed Ziya as Raalhey
 Abdulla Naseer as Idress
 Ali Azim as Shamin’s friend
 Neena Saleem as a scanner
 Amira Ismail as Muzna

Development
The production of Dhilakai commenced in Male' in late August 2012. After shooting all the scenes required to be shot in Male', production was then shifted to Sh. Feevah, before leaving to Sh. Foakaidhoo. The film marks Mahdi Ahmed and Hussain Munawwar's second collaboration after Sazaa (2011). The film deals with a man's tumultuous journey to seek vengeance, his undoing and his eventual redemption from an unlikeliest of sources. Some of the violent scenes in the film were based on real incidents that happened in different corners of Maldives.

Soundtrack

Release and reception
The film was released on 27 May 2013. The film attracted negative reception from critics. Ahmed Nadheem of Haveeru wrote: "The film is similar to a ship without a direction, an aimless screenplay leading the director to no path. Embraced with futile characters, impractical scenes and out-dated music, the film has problems in each department". Summarising his review, Nadheem labels the film to be of "low quality" and a "displeasure".

Accolades

References

External links 
 

2013 films
2010s romantic thriller films
Maldivian romantic thriller films